Qatar Executive is a business jet subsidiary of Qatar Airways, based in Doha. It was launched on June 16, 2009 at the Paris Air Show.

Apart from its core business of aircraft charters, Qatar Executive's service portfolio also includes aircraft management, maintenance and a full range of fixed-base operator (FBO) services at Doha International Airport. As part of the Qatar Airways Group, Qatar Executive is also responsible for Qatar Airways Charter requests. With a new hangar opened in March 2011, Qatar Executive has entered the FBO and maintenance service for business jets coming to Doha.

In March 2012, Bombardier appointed Qatar Executive as its Authorized Service Facility for Challenger and Global aircraft in the Middle East.

Fleet
As of June 2020, the Qatar Executive fleet consists of the following aircraft:

Qatar Executive previously operated the Bombardier Challenger 605, all of which were retired in October 2021.

References

External links 

 

Airlines of Qatar
Airlines established in 2009
Government-owned airlines
2009 establishments in Qatar
Qatar Airways